Kimberly is an unincorporated community in Monongalia County, West Virginia, United States. Kimberly is located along County Route 15, off  West Virginia Route 7 near Blacksville.

Unincorporated communities in Monongalia County, West Virginia
Unincorporated communities in West Virginia
Morgantown metropolitan area